Grand Cheval Productions is an Auckland, New Zealand based film and television production company. In 2011 Grand Cheval won the 48HOURS Film Competition for their film The Child Jumpers.

References 

Film production companies of New Zealand
Television production companies of New Zealand
Companies based in Auckland
Mass media in Auckland